Korgan is a town and district of Ordu Province in the Black Sea region of Turkey. According to the 2000 census, the population of the district is 41,628 of which 15,587 live in the town of Korgan.

The villages of Korgan district include Aşağıkozpınar, Belalan, Beypınarı, Büyükakçakese, Çitlice, Durali, Karakışla, Koççığaz, Soğukpınar, Tatarcık, Tepeköy, Terzili, Yeniköy, Yeşilalan, Yeşildere, Yeşilyurt, and Yukarıkozpınar.

History
The district of Korgan has been a source of iron ore since the reign of Mithridates, King of Pontus, and even before that the area was occupied by Persians in the reign of Darius I in the 6th century BC, as part of the Satrapy of Pontus and Cappadocia. The Persian presence was erased by the armies of Alexander the Great in 331BC, and the area eventually became part of the Kingdom of Pontus and then the Roman Empire. This era ended in 1083 when Korgan was conquered by the Turkish armies of Danishmend Gazi. Subsequently a number of Turkish tribes ruled here until 1398 when Bayezid I brought the area, then known as Keşdere after a tributary of the River Bolaman, into the Ottoman Empire.

Notes

References

External links

 District municipality's official website 
 Road map of Korgan and environs
 Various images of Korgan, Ordu
 Korgan Dünü ve Bugünü 

 Korgan Dünü ve Bugünü 

Populated places in Ordu Province
Districts of Ordu Province